Newnan High School (NHS) is a public high school in southwestern Coweta County, Georgia, United States. It is located south of Newnan's historic downtown district. NHS is the oldest of the three Coweta County School System high schools.

Founded in 1918 as the first high school in Newnan, NHS was a Southern Accredited School by 1919. Newnan High School has been a School of Excellence three times.

Feeder schools include Evans Middle School, Smokey Road Middle School, and Madras Middle School. Madras also feeds into the nearby Northgate High School.

Athletics
NHS' athletic programs include football, soccer, baseball, gymnastics, cheerleading, track, volleyball, wrestling, tennis, swimming, softball, lacrosse, basketball, golf, cross country and marching band.

NHS' football team has competed in many region championships in the AAAAA class. The most recent was their varsity football team reaching the State Semi-Finals, losing to Northside High School from Warner Robins, Georgia.

The Cougars have won many basketball championships  and are a constant Elite 8 competitor in baseball.

Notable alumni
 Alan Bonner (class of 2009), football player (Jacksonville State, Houston Texans)
 Mike Cheever (class of 1991), football player (Georgia Tech, Jacksonville Jaguars)
 Drew Hill (class of 1975), football player (Georgia Tech, Los Angeles Rams, Houston Oilers, Atlanta Falcons)
 Alan Jackson (class of 1977), country music artist 
 Warren Newson, former professional baseball player (Chicago White Sox, Seattle Mariners, Texas Rangers)
 Alec Ogletree (class of 2010), football player (University of Georgia, St. Louis/Los Angeles Rams, New York Giants, New York Jets)
 Sergio Render (class of 2005), football player (Virginia Tech, Tampa Bay Buccaneers)
 Jerome Walton, former professional baseball player (Chicago Cubs, California Angels, Cincinnati Reds, Atlanta Braves, Baltimore Orioles, Tampa Bay Devil Rays)

In popular culture
Some scenes in The Walking Dead episode "Save The Last One" (season 2, episode 3), were filmed in and near the NHS campus.

The High School scene of the Christmas themed Slasher film Santa's Slay was filmed on campus.

References

External links
Newnan High School

Public high schools in Georgia (U.S. state)
Schools in Coweta County, Georgia